Franklin Webster may refer to:

Franklin Webster (publisher) (1862-1933), American publisher
Franklin Webster (footballer) (born 1978), Honduran footballer